T-cell activation RhoGTPase activating protein is a protein that in humans is encoded by the TAGAP gene.

Function

This gene encodes a member of the Rho GTPase-activator protein superfamily. The encoded protein may function as a Rho GTPase-activating protein. Alterations in this gene may be associated with several diseases, including rheumatoid arthritis, celiac disease, and multiple sclerosis. Alternate splicing results in multiple transcript variants encoding distinct isoforms.

References

Further reading